Harold Homer Chase (February 13, 1883 – May 18, 1947), nicknamed "Prince Hal", was an American professional baseball first baseman and manager in Major League Baseball, widely viewed as the best fielder at his position. During his career, he played for the New York Highlanders (1905–1913), Chicago White Sox (1913–1914), Buffalo Blues (1914–1915), Cincinnati Reds (1916–1918), and New York Giants (1919).

Babe Ruth and Walter Johnson named Chase the best first baseman ever, and contemporary reports described his glovework as outstanding. He is sometimes considered the first true star of the franchise that would eventually become the New York Yankees.  In 1981, 62 years after his last major league game, baseball historians Lawrence Ritter and Donald Honig included him in their book The 100 Greatest Baseball Players of All Time.

Despite being an excellent hitter and his reputation as a peerless defensive player, Chase's legacy was tainted by a litany of corruption.  He allegedly gambled on baseball games, and also engaged in suspicious play in order to throw games in which he played. He was also indicted as an early conspirator in the 1919 Black Sox scandal but was acquitted. He was informally banned from the majors late in the 1919 season, and formally banned in the aftermath of the Black Sox scandal.

Career
Chase attended Santa Clara College, where he played baseball. He signed his first contract with the Los Angeles Angels of the Class-A Pacific Coast League in 1904. The New York Highlanders selected Chase from Los Angeles in the 1904 Rule 5 draft on October 4, 1904.

Chase joined the Highlanders in 1905, and held out during March 1907, threatening to sign with the outlaw California League if the Highlanders did not increase his salary to $4,000. Though he agreed to join the Highlanders in April 1907, he also insisted on playing in the California League during the winter. After the Highlanders fired manager Clark Griffith during the 1908 season, Chase held out and insisted he would not play for new manager Kid Elberfeld.  Chase loved playing in the off season in California leagues, which he did nearly every year.  And nearly every year, as the major league season approached, Chase looked for a way to remain playing in California.  The National Commission ruled that any player who continued in the California league would be  suspended from the leagues. Chase continued to play under a pseudonym, Hal Schultz, even as other players returned. Because of the power of the National Agreement and insufficient finances of leagues and teams in California, Chase predictably returned to his major league team and was reinstated in 1908. 

He left the team again and returned to the California League in September of the 1908 season. Chase reportedly had been angry that Kid Elberfeld was hired over him to manage the team. He claimed that the Yankees’ management had fed a negative story about him to a local newspaper. He played out the rest of the season and paid a fine to get reinstated for the 1909 season.

Late in the 1910 season, Chase took over as player-manager from George Stallings. Stallings alleged that Chase was “laying down” in games, ostensibly with the goal of replacing Stallings as manager as the team's fortunes sank. He informed the team that he would resign if Chase was not released. In September, Stallings was called to a meeting with Yankees management where he was fired as manager in favor of Chase. In 1911, he managed the team to a 76–76 record and quit as manager following the season.

He signed a three-year contract with the Yankees before the 1913 season, but his hitting fell off that season, hitting only .221. Chase had battled injuries that impaired his play. Frank Chance stated that he worried that Chase was "laying down."  Chance clarified that he was referring to the question whether Chase would put forth the effort necessary to overcome the current slump. These factors combined led the team to field offers for the player. On June 1, 1913, Yankees traded him to the Chicago White Sox for Babe Borton and Rollie Zeider. 

Before the 1914 season, Chase jumped from the White Sox to the Buffalo Blues of the Federal League. White Sox owner Charles Comiskey filed an injunction to prevent Chase from playing citing a violation of the reserve clause.  Chase challenged the injunction in court and won, becoming one of the only players to successfully challenge the reserve clause.  The ensuing animosity between Comiskey and Chase would effectively permanently bar Chase from playing again in the American League.

Later career and gambling allegations
Following a spell in the short-lived Federal League, he went to the Reds. In 1916, Chase led the NL with a .339 batting average. 

In 1918, his career in Cincinnati ended after his manager, Christy Mathewson, accused him of “indifferent playing”, or betting on baseball and throwing games. Mathewson suspended him indefinitely. Pitcher Jimmy Ring accused Chase of attempting to bribe him in the 1917 season, Chase offered him $50 ($ in current dollar terms) to throw a game against the Giants. Even though Ring refused the team lost the game and Chase paid Ring the money. After Ring reported the incident, Greasy Neale accused Chase of saying that he bragged about winning $500 after a Reds loss and later advised Neale to wager on the Reds before a game.

Before the 1919 season, the N.L. President John Heydler held a hearing on Chase. While he found that Chase “did not take baseball or anything else seriously”, he determined that the charges against Chase were general and unsubstantiated and found him not guilty. The league president noted that in one game where Chase was accused of betting against Cincinnati, he hit a home run to put his team ahead.

Despite the exoneration, the Reds wanted no part of Chase, and arranged a trade with the New York Giants for Walter Holke and Bill Rariden. The deal was held up by Reds president August Herrmann because Chase sued the club for back pay from his suspension. The Giants agreed to settle the matter with Chase and the trade went through on February 19, 1919.

Before the 1920 season, former player Lee Magee, who later sued the Chicago Cubs for allegedly “blackballing” him from baseball, threatened to release the names of players who had thrown games. One of these players was Chase, with whom Magee played in Cincinnati. Magee charged that he and Chase had wagered $500 against Cincinnati on a game against the Boston Braves. Cincinnati won that game with Magee scoring the winning run. The National League president dismissed Magee's claims in that they were based on claims during the 1918 season that he had already ruled were unsubstantiated. The Cubs responded that Magee had confessed to wagering on his own team's game. Magee admitted to this but thought that he was betting on Cincinnati and that Chase told him after the game that they lost the wager. On June 9, 1920, a jury found in favor of the Cubs. 

In September 1919, Chase and Heinie Zimmerman were dropped from the Giants lineup. In 1920, the league revealed that Heydler ordered Chase and Zimmerman released when Magee confessed to Heydler behind closed doors. Since no American League team would sign him, he was effectively blackballed from the major leagues.

Out of organized baseball
In 1920, while playing for the minor Mission League, he allegedly attempted to bribe Spider Baum, a pitcher for the Salt Lake City Bees of the Pacific Coast League, to lose a game to the Los Angeles Angels.  It turned out to be one of the last games he played in organized baseball. After an investigation by the league, he was barred from the Pacific Coast League and the Mission Baseball League. Babe Borton, for whom Chase was traded in 1913, was also suspended in the scandal.

In late 1920, pitcher Rube Benton accused Chase and Heinie Zimmerman of attempting to bring him $800 to throw a game when the three played for the Giants. As part of his accusation, he charged that Chase informed him that the White Sox would lose the first two games of the 1919 World Series and would lose the series. He also testified that Chase communicated with Bill Burns, one of the key figures in the Black Sox scandal and that Chase won $40,000 (equivalent to $ million in ) betting on the series.

In October of that year, a Chicago grand jury indicted him for his role in the Black Sox Scandal, alleging that he brought the idea of throwing the World Series to Abe Attell (Heinie Zimmerman was also indicted). California refused extradition because of an incorrectly issued arrest warrant. Chase and the other accused players were acquitted on August 2, 1921.

Baseball commissioner Kenesaw Mountain Landis later declared that any players who had been involved in throwing games would be banned from baseball, which could have included Chase; however Judge Landis never formally ruled on Chase. But based on Chase's long-term pattern of gambling and his role in the Black Sox Scandal, Landis' declaration after the Black Sox trial is seen as formalizing Chase's ban. Regardless, his career was effectively over by the time Landis was appointed. In his only formal hearing on the matter, National League president John Heydler found him not guilty.

Chase was recruited and hired by the Nogales Internationals to play first base and manage the club for the 1923 season. Chase played for a team in Williams, Arizona, playing games in other mining towns such as Jerome. In early March 1925, newspapers reported that Chase was negotiating with the President of Mexico to become the commissioner of a new Mexican Baseball League. 

For a time, Chase was player-manager of an outlaw team in Douglas, Arizona that included banned Black Sox players Buck Weaver, Chick Gandil and Lefty Williams. It was part of a league run by S.L.A. Marshall, who later said that Chase admitted to throwing a game. A few months later, he tore both Achilles tendons in a car accident. He later drifted to Mexico, where in 1925 he began making plans to organize a professional league.  When American League president Ban Johnson got word of it, however, he pressured Mexican authorities to deport Chase.

Despite his unsavory past, Chase received a certain amount of National Baseball Hall of Fame support early in its history. During the inaugural Hall of Fame balloting of 1936, Chase garnered 11 votes and was named on 4.9% of the ballots. This total was more votes than 18 future Hall of Famers including such greats as Connie Mack, Rube Marquard, Mordecai "Three Finger" Brown, Charlie Gehringer, and John McGraw as well as the banned Shoeless Joe Jackson. In 1937, he received 18 votes (9%) which was more than 32 future Hall of Famers. Chase was dropped from the ballot following the 1937 vote.  He never received the 75 percent support required for enshrinement, largely due to an informal agreement among the Hall of Fame voters that those deemed to have been banned from baseball should be ineligible for consideration.

Chase spent the rest of his life drifting between Arizona and his native California, working numerous low-paying jobs. Later in life, he expressed considerable remorse for betting on baseball. He lived with his sister in Williams, California and died in a Colusa, California hospital at the age of 64.

Chase defensively
In his day, Hal Chase was almost universally considered one of the best fielders in the game — not just at first base, but at any position, even compared to catchers and middle infielders. In his Historical Baseball Abstract, Bill James quotes a poem entitled "You Can't Escape 'Em":

Sometimes a raw recruit in spring is not a pitching find;

He has not Walter Johnson's wing, nor Matty's wonderous mind.

He does not act like Harold Chase upon the fielding job,

But you may find in such a case, he hits like Tyrus Cobb.

Douglas Dewey and Nicholas Acocella's book on Chase, The Black Prince Of Baseball, talks about Chase's defensive abilities at length. He apparently made many spectacular plays that burnished his reputation as a glove wizard, but also committed 402 errors at first in just ten seasons, making his career fielding average only .980, four points below average for the period (since Chase was known to throw games, it's impossible to know how many of these misplays were intentional).

A more recent work by Bill James, Win Shares, suggested Chase was only a C-grade defensive player at first base. According to analyst Sean Smith of Baseball-Reference.com, Chase was below average defensively, costing his teams 65 runs versus an average first baseman.

Managerial record

See also

List of Major League Baseball career stolen bases leaders
List of Major League Baseball player-managers

References
Bibliography
Ginsburg, Daniel E.  The Fix Is In: A History of Baseball Gambling and Game Fixing Scandals.  inMcFarland and Co., 1995, 317 pages.  .  Contains a chapter dedicated to Chase and his various scandals.
Goode, Christopher California Baseball:  From the Pioneers to the Glory Years.  Lulu Press, 2009, 390 pages. 
Pietrusza, David. Rothstein: The Life, Times, and Murder of the Criminal Genius Who Fixed the 1919 World Series. Basic Books, 2011, 528 pages. .
Bevill, Lynn. Prince Hal and his Arizona Odyssey. Douglas, Ariz., Cochise County Historical and Archaeological Society, 1991.
In-line citations

External links

 
 
 

1883 births
1947 deaths
Major League Baseball first basemen
New York Highlanders players
New York Yankees players
Chicago White Sox players
Buffalo Buffeds players
Cincinnati Reds players
New York Giants (NL) players
New York Highlanders managers
Baseball players from California
National League batting champions
Los Angeles Angels (minor league) players
San Jose (minor league baseball) players
San Jose Prune Pickers players
Stockton Millers players
Major League Baseball player-managers
Santa Clara Broncos baseball players
People from Los Gatos, California
People from Colusa County, California
Burials at Oak Hill Memorial Park